The Provost of Bruges is a historical tragedy by the British writer George William Lovell. It premiered at the Theatre Royal, Covent Garden in London on 10 February 1836. The original cast featured William Macready as Bertulphe, Provost of Bruges, James Prescott Warde as Tancmar, Charles James Mathews as Gautier, Drinkwater Meadows as Phillipe, William Payne as Denis, Robert William Honner as Page, Ellen Kean as Constance and Mary Gossop Vining as Ursula.

References

Bibliography
 Nicoll, Allardyce. A History of Early Nineteenth Century Drama 1800-1850. Cambridge University Press, 1930.
 Taylor, George. Players and Performances in the Victorian Theatre. Manchester University Press, 1993.

1836 plays
West End plays
British plays
Tragedy plays
Historical plays
Plays set in the 12th century
Plays set in Belgium
Plays by George William Lovell